ʿAlqama or ʿAlḳama (Arabic: علقمة) was a  distinguished Muslim general who served in northern Iberia at the beginning of the 8th century.

By order of Munuza, governor of the Kingdom of Asturias, Al Qama commanded an army tasked to end the riot of Pelagius of Asturias. Al Qama's army arrived and set up camp in the Cantabrian Mountains near the town of Covadonga where Pelagius was hiding. After Pelagius refused to surrender, Al Qama ordered his soldiers to enter the mountain pass where they were ambushed in the ensuing Battle of Covadonga. Al Qama was killed and his army dispersed and retreated from Asturias.

He was probably the father of ʿAbd al-Raḥmān ibn ʿAlḳama al-Lakhmī who later became the governor of Arbunah.

References 

722 deaths
Al-Andalus military personnel